Joe Jenkins was an American dancer who moved to Australia and appeared in a number of TV plays. He was a rare black actor who played lead roles in Australian film industry at the time. He was the first black actor to play a lead role in an Australian TV drama.

Jenkins came to Australia with the Katherine Dunham Dance Company and decided to stay. He made his acting debut in The Square Ring.

Select filmography
Rita (1959) - TV opera
Make Outs Music (1959) - variety
Cafe Continental
The BP Super Show (1959) - variety show, guest star
The Square Ring (1960)
The Emperor Jones (1960)
The Two Headed Eagle (1960)
The End Begins (1961)
Call Me a Liar (1961)
Just Barbara (1961) and Chez Barbara -  variety show starring Barbara Virgil - Jenkins was a regular performer

References

External links
Joe Jenkins at Ausstage
Joe Jenkins at IMDb

Australian actors